Teen Town was a Detroit based music variety show that ran in syndication in the mid-1960s. It was hosted by legendary Motor City DJ Robin Seymour. In its brief run, the show featured well-known acts like the Supremes with Diana Ross, the Temptations, the Miracles with Smokey Robinson, Marvin Gaye, Martha & the Vandellas, Stevie Wonder, and the Parliaments.  Clips from the show are often used in Motown documentaries. Rights to surviving footage of the show are now owned by Research Video.

References

Dance television shows
1960s American music television series
First-run syndicated television programs in the United States
Pop music television series
1965 American television series debuts
1966 American television series endings
1960s American variety television series